Boston F.C. or Boston Football Club may refer to one of these association football (soccer) clubs:

England

 Boston F.C. (1878), Boston, Lincolnshire, football club from the 1880s
 Boston Town F.C., Boston, Lincolnshire of the United Counties League Premier Division (tiers 9-10 of the English football league system)
 Boston United F.C., Boston, Lincolnshire of the National League North (tier 6 of the English football league system)

United States

 Boston City FC, Malden, Massachusetts (near Boston), of the National Premier Soccer League, the fourth tier of the United States soccer league system
 FC Boston, Waban, Massachusetts (near Boston), of the Premier Development League, unofficially the premier men's amateur soccer league of the United States and Canada
 New England Revolution, Foxborough, Massachusetts (near Boston) of Major League Soccer, the premier soccer league of the United States and Canada

See also
 Boston RFC (disambiguation)
 Boston Soccer Club, an historic soccer club in Boston, Massachusetts in the 1920s
 New England Patriots, Foxborough, Massachusetts of the National Football League, the premier American football league in the United States